Amang Hustler is a 1987 Filipino action crime film written and directed by Mike Relon Makiling and starring Rhene Imperial in the title role of George "Amang" King, alongside Ramon Zamora, Philip Gamboa, Melissa Mendez, Robert Lee, and Anita Linda. Set in Binondo, Manila, the film is about Amang, a Chinese mestizo who is jailed for a crime he did not commit, only to be lead into a life of crime after his release and become the new kingpin of a gambling syndicate. The film was released on March 6, 1987.

Critic Justino Dormiendo of the Manila Standard gave the film a negative review, criticizing the film's exploitative violence and poor characterizations of Chinese Filipinos.

Cast
Rhene Imperial as George "Amang" King
Ramon Zamora
Philip Gamboa
Melissa Mendez as Amang's fiancee
Robert Lee
Anita Linda as Amang's mother

Release
Amang Hustler was released in theaters on March 6, 1987.

Critical response
Justino Dormiendo, writing for the Manila Standard, gave the film a negative review, disparaging the "senselessness and meaninglessness" of the violence in its action scenes. He stated that "Here, [the violence] is used for sheer exploitation, unsparingly, reveling in bloodshed after bloodshed, until the whole movie crumbles in the pool of its gore." Dormiendo also criticized the film's poor characterization of its Chinese Filipino characters with their lack of cultural nuances, as well as the lack of policemen in the story other than Philip Gamboa's character, all of which results in an unconvincing film.

References

1987 films
1980s crime action films
1987 action films
Filipino-language films
Films set in Manila
Philippine action films
Philippine crime action films
Films directed by Mike Relon Makiling